William Christopher Zeise (15 October 1789 – 12 November 1847) was a Danish organic chemist. He is best known for synthesising one of the first organometallic compounds, named Zeise's salt in his honour. He also performed pioneering studies in organosulfur chemistry, discovering the xanthates in 1823.

Early life
William Christopher Zeise was born 15 October 1789 in Slagelse, the son of an apothecary, Frederick Zeise (1754–1836), who was an old friend of physicist Hans Christian Ørsted's father. Zeise attended Slagelse Latin school until he went to Copenhagen in 1805 to take up an apprenticeship under Gottfried Becker as a pharmacy assistant (Apoteksmedhjælper) at the Royal Court Pharmacy. Gottfried Becker, was an accomplished chemist who was employed as extraordinary Professor of Chemistry at the University. However Zeise felt dissatisfied there and returned home complaining of his health after having been there only a few months.

Around this time his interest in science (Natural Philosophy) began to develop. He familiarised himself with the new quantitative chemical theory of Antoine Lavosier; and read widely, including - Nicolai Tychsen's "Apothekerkunst" (Theoretical and practical instructions for Pharmacists, 1804),  Gren's Chemistry, Adam Hauch's Principles of Natural Philosophy and Ørsted's papers in Scandinavian Literature and Letters (whose treatise on spontaneous combustion made an especially strong impression on him). At the same time he experimented with a home-made voltaic pile. At 17 years old, he rearranged his father's pharmacy in accordance with the new pharmacopoeia of 1805, which had imposed the antiphlogistic nomenclature. About the same time (summer of 1806) he mentioned in his diary "a most remarkable awakening within me for something higher, for scientific creative work in general, but for Science, chiefly Chemistry, deeply and in particular". How strong an impression this inner experience had made on him, can be established by the fact that he now wanted to return to Copenhagen, not to return to the Court apothecary, but to pursue a path studying chemistry.

Formal academic education
In autumn 1806, he was welcomed into the family home of Ørsted, where he was given a position as an Assistant, helping Ørsted prepare his university lectures. His stay with Ørsted lasted several years and was certainly of the greatest importance for his development. Ørsted himself recounted how he influenced Zeise through conversations and encouraged him when he expressed the desire to take the university entrance examination (Examen artium).  Ørsted spoke fondly of Zeise's independent spirit. Zeise became a university student in 1809.

Zeise had at first intended to study medicine, but while attending lectures it became clear that his interests had a broader scientific base; and chemistry remained his favourite subject. He still experimented in Ørsted's Laboratory, but since at that time there was no prospect for a teaching position at the University, he took the pharmacist exam in 1815, later a master's degree (magisterkonferens) and on 21 October 1817 he defended his Doctoral dissertation on 'The effect of Alkalies upon organic substances'. The experimental part of this work he performed in a small laboratory, which in 1816 he had converted from the pharmacy in Slagelse.

As the university had no separate Lecturing Chair in Chemistry and no scientific laboratory, Zeise decided to work and study abroad. In 1818 he managed to get travelling money. Zeise arrived in Göttingen, where he spent four months working in Friedrich Stromeyer's laboratory, one of the few experimental laboratories in Germany at that time. He was trained particularly in analytical chemistry, in which he would become a great master. Zeise next spent nearly a year in Paris. His diary entries reflect how diligent he was, and depict vividly the impression he got of the famous French scientists he came in contact with. In August 1818, while in Paris, Zeise became personally acquainted with the distinguished Swedish chemist Jöns Jacob Berzelius. Berzelius received the young Danish chemist with great benevolence, expressing his admiration for Zeise's Doctoral thesis. They continued a respectful friendship thereafter, despite Zeise being ten years younger than Berzelius.

Independent academic career
Zeise returned to Denmark in the autumn of 1819. The prospects were not bright for an appointment at the University, although he was likely the only scientifically trained chemist in the country at that time. However, he learned at the end of the year that he had received public funds to support his work in science. That same year the university rented an apartment in Nørregade for use as a physics workshop and for physics education. Ørsted converted the apartment kitchen into a menial little laboratory, over which Zeise was made responsible. In this, the so-called "Royal Science Laboratory", Zeise received 10 students in the first year to whom he lectured, both in the laboratory and partly in the physical workshop. In June 1822 Zeise was appointed extraordinary Professor of Chemistry. In 1824, Professor Ørsted selected a nearby farm as the site for what would later become the Danish Polytechnic Education Institution. It was decided to transform the large stable building in the courtyard into a dedicated chemical laboratory. When the Polytechnic College was eventually founded in 1829, Zeise was instrumental in getting the chemical laboratory expanded and organised.

In 1823 while still in the small laboratory at Nørregade he identified a new family of sulfur-containing compounds, calling them xanthates (xanthus, Greek "yellow") on account of the predominantly yellow colour of xanthate salts. Zeise was accordingly awarded a silver medal by the Royal Danish Academy of Sciences and Letters, and he became a member of that body the following year on the recommendation of Ørsted. In 1836 he became a Knight of the Order of the Dannebrog, a very high honour bestowed by the Danish monarch.

As a teacher Zeise demanded strict accuracy from his pupils; together with conscientiousness, order and diligence -  the same qualities which so strongly animated him.

In February 1842 he married Maren Martine Bjerring. Zeise's health was fragile for much of his life and he suffered greatly, possibly due to his handling of noxious chemicals in poorly ventilated rooms. He died of tuberculosis in Copenhagen on 12 November 1847 and was buried in Assistens Cemetery in the same city.

Scientific discoveries

Zeise made several scientific discoveries. His discovery of mercaptans (thiols) in 1832 and thioethers in 1833, was once a weighty support for the influential (now obsolete) "Radical Theory" which Berzelius and Liebig developed, provoking important chemical studies. His discovery and work on xanthates, led to the widespread use of xanthate salts in synthetic chemistry.

In 1830, Zeise attempted to react platinum chloride with ethanol, leading to a series of platinum-based organometallic compounds. One of these compounds, originally referred to by Zeise himself as “sal kalicoplatinicus inflammabilis”, was subsequently named after him according to the tradition of the day – it is still called Zeise's salt. Zeise's claim that the newly discovered salt contained ethylene was received with distrust by Justus von Liebig, whose understandable attacks on Zeise were quite unjustified. The complex indeed contains ethylene. Attempts to establish the correct structure and composition of Zeise's salt drove much basic research during the second half of the 19th century and led to a greater sophistication in organometallic chemistry. The structure of Zeise's salt was definitively resolved only with the advent of X-ray crystallography and the nature of its platinum to ethylene bond was not understood until the development of the Dewar–Chatt–Duncanson model in the 1950s.

Shortly before he died, Zeise published his attempts to purify the pigment carotene from carrot juice while in the Polytechnic Institute; finding it to be soluble in carbon disulfide and correctly identifying it as a hydrocarbon.

References

Note: This article has been based largely on a biography of William Christopher Zeise, written in Danish by Carl Frederik Brica, in the first edition of the Dansk Biografisk Lexikon (Danish Biographical Lexicon), Volume XIX (1887-1905). The text in this article, therefore, has mostly been translated from the Danish original. The original work is in the Public Domain and is available through the Projekt Runeberg server. Where no other reference is provided the text of this article derives from this source.

1789 births
1847 deaths
People from Slagelse
Danish chemists
Organic chemists